Delta-v is a term used in astrodynamics for the total 'effort' to change from one space trajectory to another.

Delta V may also refer to:

Science and technology
Delta-V (Internet Protocol), a Web Versioning and Configuration Management Protocol specified by RFC 3253 for WebDAV
Delta-v (physics), a mathematical symbol representing a change in velocity as a scalar or vector quantity
Delta-v budget (velocity change budget), a term used in astrodynamics for velocity change requirements of propulsive tasks and orbital manoeuvres during a space mission
Delta-V charging method, a charging method for Nickel–metal hydride batteries
DeltaV, a distributed control system used in industrial process control

Other uses
Delta-v, a novel by Daniel Suarez
Delta-V (musical group), an Italian band signed by Virgin Records
Delta V (video game), a flying game published by Bethesda Softworks
"Delta-V", a song by Squarepusher from Just a Souvenir

See also
 Delta 5, a UK punk band